Mandekolu  is a village in the southern state of Karnataka, India. The nearest cities are Sullia and Adoor. It is located near the Karnataka-Kerala border, at a distance of 90 km from Mangalore city. It is located in the Sullia taluk of Dakshina Kannada district in Karnataka.

Notable people
D. V. Sadananda Gowda (born 1953), politician

Demographics
 India census, Mandekolu had a population of 5565 with 2745 males and 2820 females.

See also
 Dakshina Kannada
 Districts of Karnataka
 Tulu Gowda

References

External links
 http://dk.nic.in/

Villages in Dakshina Kannada district